Kakan is a village in Badakhshan Province in north-eastern Afghanistan. It lies on the northern part of the Kokcha River, roughly 25 miles northeast of Fayzabad.

References

Populated places in Argo District